The 1948 United States presidential election in Maryland took place on November 2, 1948, as part of the 1948 United States presidential election. State voters chose eight representatives, or electors, to the Electoral College, who voted for president and vice president.

Maryland was won by Governor Thomas Dewey (R–New York), running with Governor Earl Warren, with 49.40% of the popular vote, against incumbent President Harry S. Truman (D–Missouri), running with Senator Alben W. Barkley, with 48.01% of the popular vote. This was the first time since 1888 that Maryland's popular vote had backed a losing candidate nationwide. As of 2020, this is the last time that a Democratic candidate has won the presidency without carrying Maryland and the only time that the state has backed a losing Republican candidate. It is also the only time in history that the state has supported a Republican presidential candidate over an incumbent Democrat.

As of 2020, this remains the last of only 2 occasions in which Maryland was 5% more Republican than the nation (the other occasion being 1896).

Results

Results by county

Counties that flipped from Republican to Democratic
Allegany
Somerset

See also
 United States presidential elections in Maryland
 1948 United States presidential election
 1948 United States elections

Notes

References 

Maryland
1948
Presidential